Van den Berghen is a surname. Notable people with the surname include:

Frans Van den Berghen (born 1919), Belgian sprint canoer
Willy Vanden Berghen (1939–2022), Belgian cyclist

See also
Van den Berg

Surnames of Dutch origin